Guy of Charpigny (died 1295) was the second Baron of Vostitsa (modern Aigio) in the Principality of Achaea in Frankish Greece.

He was the son of the first baron, Hugh I of Charpigny, and succeeded him after his death in the mid-13th century.

In 1289 he also served for a few months as the bailli of the King of Naples for Achaea. He was much esteemed by the people of the Morea, but was killed at Xylokastro in 1295 by a Greek magnate from Kalavryta named Photius, who mistook him for Walter of Liederkerque, the castellan of Acrocorinth, against whom Photius had grievances. According to the Chronicle of the Morea, when the shouts of Guy's servants revealed to Photius his mistake, the Greek took the dying man in his arms and asked for forgiveness, but Guy died in his arms. He was succeeded by his son, Hugh II.

References

Sources
 
  
 

13th-century births
1295 deaths
13th-century rulers in Europe
Baillis of the Principality of Achaea
Guy
Year of birth unknown
13th-century people from the Principality of Achaea